Rodney 'Rod' L. Whittemore is an American politician and businessperson from Maine. Thomas is a Republican State Senator from Maine's 26th District, representing all of Somerset County, including the population centers of Fairfield and Skowhegan. He was born and raised in Skowhegan and owns a small business selling and servicing outdoor power equipment. He also spent 6 years in the six years in the Army National Guard. Whittemore serves on the Skowhegan Planning Board and formerly served as chairman of the Skowhegan Sewer and Water Committee.

References

Year of birth missing (living people)
Living people
Republican Party Maine state senators
People from Skowhegan, Maine
Businesspeople from Maine
Maine local politicians
21st-century American politicians